Röring is a surname. Notable people with the surname include:

 Gun Röring (1930–2006), Swedish gymnast
 Johannes Röring (born 1959), German politician